Bangladeshi English, Banglish, Benglish or Anglo-Bangla is an English accent heavily influenced by Bengali language in the Bengal region. This variety is very common among Bengalis mainly from Bangladesh, as well as the neighboring regions of West Bengal and Tripura. The term Benglish is recorded from 1972, and Banglish slightly later, in 1975.

Use 
Bengali is the sole official and national language of Bangladesh and one of the 22 scheduled official language, in India. But, English is often used secondarily in the higher tier of the judiciary in both Bangladesh and India (along with Hindi in India). Laws were written in English during the colonial periods.

Since the introduction of Bangla Bhasha Procolon Ain, all the laws by parliament and all Ordinances promulgated by the President are being enacted in Bengali in Bangladesh.

There are 10 English language newspapers in Bangladesh. English medium schools are also operated in English. Mainly, the people of Bengali (Bangladeshi) descent residing in the UK, Canada, Australia, New Zealand and the US and students of English medium schools in 
Bangladesh use Benglish (though Standard English is also tried to be taught). This applies to those originating from East India also.

However, upon public demand in 2012, the High Court of Bangladesh banned the use of Benglish, described as a slang mixture of Bengali and English, in radio and television programs "to protect local tongue."

Alongside Hinglish, Benglish is a term that has been used in academic papers to describe a mixture of Bangla and English. For example, Benglish verbs are described as a particular type of complex predicate that consists of an English word and a Bengali verb, such as  ‘to have an accident’,  ‘to get/come/put in’ or  ‘to confuse’.

History 
The East India Company adopted English as the official language of the empire in 1835. Replacement of the Persian language with English was followed by a surge in English language learning among Bengali babus. English remained an official language of the region until 1956 when the first constitution of Pakistan was adopted stating Bengali and Urdu as the official languages of the state following the Bengali language movement from 1947 to 1952.

After independence, Bengali became the sole official language of Bangladesh, and all English-medium universities, schools and colleges were converted to Bengali instruction in order to spread mass education.

Indian Government made Bengali as one of its 22 scheduled official Languages as of Eighth Schedule to the Constitution of India in 1950.

Literature

Differences between Standard English and Bangladeshi English

Numbering system 
The South Asian numbering system is preferred for digit grouping. When written in words, or when spoken,
numbers less than 100,000/100 000 are expressed just as they are in Standard English.  Numbers including and beyond 100,000 /
100 000 are expressed in a subset of the South Asian numbering system.

Thus, the following scale is used:

See also 
Bengal
Languages of Bangladesh
Languages of India
Bengali people
Bengali alphabet

References 

Languages attested from the 1970s
Languages of Bangladesh
Dialects of English
English as a global language